Bruce George Baird, AM (born 28 February 1942), is a former Australian politician whose career included a stint as Deputy Leader of the Liberal Party in New South Wales.

Early life
Baird was born in Sydney, and was educated at the University of Sydney and the University of Melbourne, holding a master's degree in business administration from the latter. He was Assistant Trade Commissioner at the Australian Embassy in Bonn, Germany, 1972–1976 and Trade Commissioner at Australian Consulate-General in New York 1977–1980. He was Government Affairs Manager for Esso Australia 1980–1984.

Political career

Baird was a member for the electorate of Northcott in the New South Wales Legislative Assembly 1984–1995. He was Minister for Transport 1988–1995, Minister for Sydney's Olympic Bid 1990–1993 and Minister for Tourism and Roads 1993–1995. He was also deputy leader of the Liberal Party from 1992 to 1994.

Baird was a Liberal member of the Australian House of Representatives from October 1998 to November 2007, representing the electorate of Cook, New South Wales. He also held the positions of chairman of the National Rail Corporation, and was a board member of ABN Amro Hoare Govett, Tourism Training Australia and Tourism Education Services. Baird along with fellow Liberal MPs Petro Georgiou, Russell Broadbent and Judi Moylan opposed mandatory detention of asylum seekers.

In April 2007, he announced that he would retire at the next election. A fierce battle over his successor ensued; Michael Towke was initially preselected as the Liberal candidate, but was subsequently disendorsed and replaced with Scott Morrison, who went on to win the seat.

Despite being a former deputy leader of the Liberal Party in New South Wales, Baird never served as a Federal Government minister during his time in Federal Parliament. Baird had been overlooked for promotion by Prime Minister John Howard because he was a supporter of Deputy Liberal leader and Howard's heir apparent Peter Costello.

Another factor that precluded Baird's promotion by Howard was that Baird's preselection for Cook prior to the 1998 election came against Howard's wishes as Howard had supported the previous Liberal member and preselected candidate for Cook, Stephen Mutch.

Sensing that he would not be promoted by Howard, Baird in 2004 sought to become Speaker but was unsuccessful with David Hawker chosen as the Government's candidate for Speaker instead.

After politics
Baird was appointed Chairman of the Tourism and Transport Forum, a peak industry lobby group, in 2008. In the same year, he was also appointed as chair of the Refugee Resettlement Advisory Council, which advises the Australian government on resettling refugees in Australia. In 2010 on Australia Day, he was appointed a Member of the Order of Australia for service to the Parliament of Australia, and to the community of New South Wales through a range of business, tourism and welfare organisations. In August 2017, Business Events Sydney announced the appointment of Baird as their new Chairman, commencing from 1 September 2017.

Private life 
Bruce and Judy Baird's children are Steve Baird, Chief Executive Officer International Justice Mission Australia; Julia Baird, columnist with the Sydney Morning Herald and host of the ABC News program The Drum; and Mike Baird, now Chief Executive Officer of HammondCare, and previously the Premier of New South Wales from 2014 to 2017. (Baird himself made an attempt to become Premier when he was a candidate to succeed Nick Greiner in 1992, but lost out to John Fahey.)

Following the financial collapse of a number of private providers of education to international students, in 2009 Baird agreed to head up a review into international education in Australia. Baird delivered the report in a joint press conference in March 2010. Included in his recommendations were tighter regulation including stronger entry requirements, improved risk assessment, and where breaches occur, tougher penalties.

He is a patron of the Asylum Seekers Centre, a not-for-profit that provides personal and practical support to people seeking asylum in Australia.

Notes

 

1942 births
Living people
Australian businesspeople
Liberal Party of Australia members of the Parliament of Australia
Members of the Australian House of Representatives for Cook
Members of the Australian House of Representatives
Members of the New South Wales Legislative Assembly
Politicians from Sydney
Members of the Order of Australia
Liberal Party of Australia members of the Parliament of New South Wales
21st-century Australian politicians
20th-century Australian politicians